A statue of John Lewis by Gregory Johnson is slated for installation in Atlanta, in the U.S. state of Georgia.

References

Sculptures of African Americans
Statues of politicians